A monograph is a specialist work of writing (in contrast to reference works) or exhibition on a single subject or an aspect of a subject, often by a single author or artist, and usually on a scholarly subject.

In library cataloging, monograph has a broader meaning—that of a nonserial publication complete in one volume (book) or a definite number of volumes. Thus it differs from a serial or periodical publication such as a magazine, academic journal, or newspaper. In this context only, books such as novels are considered monographs.

Academia 

The English term "monograph" is derived from modern Latin "monographia", which has its root in Greek. In the English word, "mono-" means "single" and "-graph" means "something written". Unlike a textbook, which surveys the state of knowledge in a field, the main purpose of a monograph is to present primary research and original scholarship. This research is presented at length, distinguishing a monograph from an article. For these reasons, publication of a monograph is commonly regarded as vital for career progression in many academic disciplines. Intended for other researchers and bought primarily by libraries, monographs are generally published as individual volumes in a short print run.

In Britain and the U.S., what differentiates a scholarly monograph from an academic trade title varies by publisher, though generally it is the assumption that the readership has not only specialized or sophisticated knowledge but also professional interest in the subject of the work.

Biology 
In biological taxonomy, a monograph is a comprehensive treatment of a taxon. Monographs typically review all known species within a group, add any newly discovered species, and collect and synthesize available information on the ecological associations, geographic distributions, and morphological variations within the group.

The first-ever monograph of a plant taxon was Robert Morison's 1672 Plantarum Umbelliferarum Distributio Nova, a treatment of the Apiaceae.

Art 

Book publishers use the term "artist monograph" to indicate books dealing with a single artist, as opposed to broader surveys of art subjects.

United States Food and Drug Administration 

In the context of Food and Drug Administration (FDA) regulation, monographs represent published standards by which the use of one or more substances is automatically authorized. For example, the following is an excerpt from the Federal Register: "The Food and Drug Administration (FDA) is issuing a final rule in the form of a final monograph establishing conditions under which over-the-counter (OTC) sunscreen drug products are generally recognized as safe and effective and not misbranded as part of FDA's ongoing review of OTC drug products." Such usage has given rise to the use of the word monograph as a verb, as in "this substance has been monographed by the FDA".

See also 
 Compendium
 Compilation thesis
 Documentation
 Open access monograph
 Treatise

References 

Academic publishing
Books by type
Book terminology
Broad-concept articles
Publishing
Monographs